Lupus Racing Team was an American UCI Continental cycling team established in 2014. LRT was dedicated to raising awareness and funding in search of a cure for this autoimmune disease. In late 2016, it was announced that the team was closing.

Team roster

Major wins
2016
Stage 7 Vuelta Independencia Nacional Republica Dominicana, Michael Olheiser
Challenge du Prince - Trophée Princier, Thomas Vaubourzeix
Stage 3 Tour de Tunisie, Thomas Vaubourzeix
Stage 2 Grand Prix Cycliste de Saguenay, Bryan Lewis

References

UCI Continental Teams (America)
Cycling teams established in 2014
Cycling teams based in the United States
2014 establishments in the United States